The McGaw Medical Center of Northwestern University is a consortium of urban, suburban, specialized, and general hospitals and Northwestern University. The member hospitals of the center have a total bed capacity of more than 2200.

Education
Chartered in 1966 and honoring the generosity of the late Foster G. McGaw and Mary McGaw, the center presents a greater range of clinical and research experiences than individual teaching hospitals are able to provide. The various hospitals support both independent and cooperative programs. Almost all members of the medical staffs have faculty appointments at Northwestern University's Feinberg School of Medicine and serve as important links between medical education and medical practice.

Members
Members of the McGaw Medical Center include:
Northwestern University Feinberg School of Medicine
Northwestern Memorial Hospital
Lurie Children's Hospital
Shirley Ryan AbilityLab

Honors
The hospitals of the McGaw Medical Center consistently rank among the nation's best by U.S. News & World Report, which in 2007 noted eleven specialties in which the hospitals excelled. Five of these specialties are currently ranked in the top 20 nationally.

External links
 The McGaw Medical Center of Northwestern University
 Northwestern University Feinberg School of Medicine
 Northwestern Memorial Hospital
 Children's Memorial Hospital
 Rehabilitation Institute of Chicago

References 

Hospital networks in the United States
Northwestern University
1966 establishments in Illinois
Medical and health organizations based in Illinois